Real-time describes various operations or processes that respond to inputs reliably within a specified time interval.

Real-time, realtime, or real time may also refer to:

Companies
 Realtime Associates, an American video game developer
 Realtime Games Software, a defunct British video game developer
 Realtime Gaming, a company that develops gambling software
 Realtime Worlds, a Scottish game developer

Film, television and radio
 Real time (media), a method where events are portrayed at the same rate at which the characters experience them
 Real Time (Doctor Who), a webcast
 Real Time (film), a 2008 film
 RealTime (radio show), a radio show on CBC 2
 Real Time (Italy), an Italian television channel
 Real Time with Bill Maher, a talk show on HBO

Music
 Real Time (The Jazztet album), 1986, by the Art Farmer/Benny Golson Jazztet
 Real Time (Steam album), 1996
 Real Time (Van der Graaf Generator album), 2007
 Realtime (C:Real album), 1997
 Realtime (Shapeshifter album), 2001
 Realtime (quartet), a barbershop quartet

Literature
Real Time (2004), a novel by Pnina Moed Kass
 RealTime, an Australian arts magazine

Art 

 Real Time (art series), a series of clocks by Maarten Baas

See also
 
 On the fly, a phrase used to describe something that is being changed while it is ongoing